Lac Ste. Anne County is a municipal district in central Alberta, Canada.

It is located in Census Division 13, north west of Edmonton. Highway 43 stretches across this county. Its municipal office is located in the Hamlet of Sangudo.

The county was named after Lac Ste. Anne, which in turn was named for Saint Anne.

Geography

Communities and localities 
The following urban municipalities are surrounded by Lac Ste. Anne County.
Cities
none
Towns
Mayerthorpe
Onoway
Villages
Alberta Beach
Summer villages
Birch Cove
Castle Island
Nakamun Park
Ross Haven
Silver Sands
South View
Sunrise Beach
Sunset Point
Val Quentin
West Cove
Yellowstone

The following hamlets are located within Lac Ste. Anne County.
Hamlets
Cherhill
Glenevis
Green Court
Gunn
Rich Valley
Rochfort Bridge
Sangudo (location of municipal office)

The following localities are located within Lac Ste. Anne County.
Localities

Ardea Park
Arndt Acres
Aspen Hills
Ballantine
Balm
Bay Bridge Park
Bilby
Birchwood Estates
Cheviot Hills
Cheyenne Estates
Connor Creek
Corsair Cove Subdivision
Cosmo
Darbyson Estates
Darwell
Darwell Rolling Woods
Fern Valley Trailer Park
Forest West
Glenford
Glenister
Golden Glen Estates

Hansen-Mayer
Heatherdown
Heldar
Highland Park Subdivision
Hillview Estates
Hoffman Beach
Home Acres
Horne Beach
Jalna
Johnston Park
Jones Beach
Lac la Nonne
Lac Ste. Anne
Lac Ste. Anne Settlement
Lake Isle
Lake Majeau
Lakewood Estates
Laurentian Heights
Lisburn
Louden Park
Manly

Mayfair Park
Mission Creek Estates
Nakamun
Noyes Crossing
Noyes Crossing Estates
Padstow
Paradise Estates
Peavine
Pembridge
Robinson
Ronan
Roydale
Spruce Lane
Stanger
Ste Anne
Stettin
Tri Lakes Manor
Valhalla Acres
Warawa Estates
Woodland Bay

Demographics 
In the 2021 Census of Population conducted by Statistics Canada, Lac Ste.

In the 2016 Census of Population conducted by Statistics Canada, Lac Ste. Anne County had a population of 10,899 living in 4,346 of its 5,385 total private dwellings, a  change from its 2011 population of 10,260.

Attractions 

The municipality of Lac Ste. Anne maintains the Lessard Lake Campground, the Lessard Lake Outdoor Ed Centre, the Riverside Campground, and the Paddle River Dam Campground.

Many summer villages are established, especially on lake shores (such as Lac Ste. Anne, Lac la Nonne, Nakamun Lake, and Lake Isle).

Protected and recreational areas in the county include Lily Lake Provincial Natural Area, Pembina River Provincial Natural Area, Majeau Lake Provincial Natural Area (with two campgrounds), Paddle River Dam Picnic Site, Park Court Provincial Natural Area, Lily Lake Provincial Natural Area and Prefontaine and Brock Lake Provincial Natural Area.

Lac Ste. Anne Mission
Lac Ste. Anne Pilgrimage

See also 
List of communities in Alberta
List of municipal districts in Alberta

References

External links 

 
Municipal districts in Alberta